All is at Stake is a 1932 German comedy thriller film directed by Max Nosseck and starring Luciano Albertini, Claire Rommer and Ernő Verebes.

Cast
 Luciano Albertini
 Claire Rommer
 Ernő Verebes
 Carl Auen
 Domenico Gambino
 Eddie Polo
 Willi Schur
 Walter Steinbeck
 Norbert Miller
 Gustav Püttjer

References

Bibliography

External links

1932 films
Films of the Weimar Republic
1930s comedy thriller films
German comedy thriller films
1930s German-language films
Films directed by Max Nosseck
German black-and-white films
1932 comedy films
1930s German films